The American Treaty on Pacific Settlement (also known as the Pact of Bogotá) was signed by the independent republics of America gathered at the Ninth International Conference of American States in Bogotá, Colombia, on 30 April 1948.

The purpose of the treaty was to impose a general obligation on the signatories to settle their disputes through peaceful means. It also required them to exhaust regional dispute-settlement mechanisms before placing matters before the United Nations Security Council. It is one of the treaties that confer jurisdiction on the International Court of Justice.

Signed and ratified without reservations

Signed and ratified with reservations

Signed but not ratified
1

1

1 Signed with reservations.

Denounced
 (on 24 November 1973)
 – On 28 November 2012, Colombia announced it would withdraw from the treaty following an adverse ruling by the International Court of Justice.

Notes

External links
American Treaty on Pacific Settlement (Pact of Bogota), Organization of American States.

International Court of Justice
Treaties concluded in 1948
Treaties entered into force in 1949
1948 in Colombia
Organization of American States treaties
Treaties of Bolivia
Treaties of the Second Brazilian Republic
Treaties of Chile
Treaties of Costa Rica
Treaties of Ecuador
Treaties of Haiti
Treaties of Honduras
Treaties of Mexico
Treaties of Nicaragua
Treaties of Panama
Treaties of Paraguay
Treaties of Peru
Treaties of the Dominican Republic
Treaties of Uruguay